Novodniprovka (Ukrainian: Новодніпровка) is a village Vasylivka Raion in Zaporizhzhia Oblast in southern Ukraine that has a population of 1,640. The village is within 5 miles of the Zaporizhzhia Nuclear Power Plant.

An attempt for a Polish migrant to retrieve her 12-year-old son living in Novodniprovka was unsuccessful in early March 2022 and chronicled by a Wall Street Journal reporter.

History 
The area was settled by the Zaporozhian Cossacks in the 1740s. On 7 March 2022, the nearby town of Vasylika was captured by Russian forces during the 2022 Russian invasion of Ukraine.

References

Populated places established in the Russian Empire
Populated places on the Dnieper in Ukraine
Villages in Vasylivka Raion